The SAM-II riboswitch is a RNA element found predominantly in Alphaproteobacteria that binds S-adenosyl methionine (SAM). Its structure and sequence appear to be unrelated to the SAM riboswitch found in Gram-positive bacteria.  This SAM riboswitch is located upstream of the metA and metC genes in Agrobacterium tumefaciens, and other methionine and SAM biosynthesis genes in other alpha-proteobacteria.  Like the other SAM riboswitch, it probably functions to turn off expression of these genes in response to elevated SAM levels. A significant variant of SAM-II riboswitches was found in Pelagibacter ubique and related marine bacteria and called SAM-V.  Also, like many structured RNAs, SAM-II riboswitches can tolerate long loops between their stems.

Structure
The SAM-II riboswitch is short with less than 70 nucleotides and is structurally relatively simple being composed of a single hairpin and a pseudoknot.

See also
 SAM-I riboswitch
 SAM-III riboswitch
 SAM-IV riboswitch
 SAM-V riboswitch
 SAM-VI riboswitch

References

External links
 

Cis-regulatory RNA elements
Riboswitch